Jessie O. Thomas (21 December 1885 – 18 February 1972) was a prominent African-American educator from Atlanta.  He was founder of the Atlanta University School of Social Work in 1920 and first director of the Southern Field Division of the National Urban League.

Thomas spoke at the 1921 opening of Joyland Park, Atlanta's first amusement park for blacks.

References

External links
 Jesse O. Thomas (1885-1972) from the New Georgia Encyclopedia Online

1885 births
1972 deaths
African-American history in Atlanta
20th-century American educators
American Red Cross personnel
People from Atlanta
People from Pike County, Alabama
20th-century African-American educators